Thrak (stylised in all caps) is the eleventh studio album by the band King Crimson released in 1995 through Virgin Records. It was preceded by the mini-album VROOOM in 1994.
It is their first full-length studio album since Three of a Perfect Pair eleven years earlier, and the only full album to feature the "Double Trio" lineup of Robert Fripp, Adrian Belew, Tony Levin, Trey Gunn, Bill Bruford and Pat Mastelotto. It is also the last time all members from the Discipline era would work together, the last new album to feature Bruford (who left in 1997), and Levin.

Recording
The album was recorded at Peter Gabriel's Real World Studios in  Box, Wiltshire, U.K. with producer David Bottrill. Bottrill previously produced The First Day, a collaborative album between Fripp and David Sylvian that featured Mastelotto as a session player. The recording presents the group in a series of unique ways: with the band consisting of two guitarists, two bassists and two drummers, the opening track begins with all six musicians in the center of the audio mix. As the album progresses, they are split into two trios, with one guitarist, bassist and drummer heard in the left channel and the other guitarist, bassist and drummer heard coming from the right channel.

"Sex Sleep Eat Drink Dream" and "One Time" were developed at studio rehearsals for the 1994 VROOOM mini-album in Woodstock, New York during April and May 1994, shortly after the reformation of King Crimson. Instrumental outtakes and improvisations from these sessions would later be released as The Vrooom Sessions in 1999. "Sex Sleep Eat Drink Dream" developed from the instrumental outtake "No Questions Asked", with a riff that differs significantly from the finished song later recorded at Real World Studios.

"Fashionable" was another instrumental from The Vrooom Sessions that was re-recorded at Real World Studios during the recording of THRAK. It features a guitar line reminiscent of David Bowie's "Fashion", on which Fripp played in 1980. Despite being reworked with various additions and refinements by the band members, the upbeat piece ended up being dropped off the final album.

"VROOOM VROOOM" incorporates a middle section originally composed by Fripp in 1974 for Red’s instrumental title track (which is actually a rhythmical variation of Red'''s original middle section). The band also experimented with said section in 1983, while working on Three of a Perfect Pair; evidence of this is the track "Working on Sleepless" from the 2016 compilation Rehearsals & Blows.

Release
First released on 3 April 1995, THRAK reached number 58 in the UK Albums Chart, their last release to chart.
The album was reissued on CD in 2002 in a remastered edition. A significantly different 5.1 surround sound mix by Jakko Jakszyk was released as a CD/DVD-A release in October 2015 for the “40th Anniversary Series”. This edition also featured a reimagined new stereo mix by Robert Fripp and Jakszyk. These two mixes were also included in the THRAK BOX, that also included previously unissued studio and live recordings from the 1994-1997 period.

ReceptionTrouser Press'' described it as "an absolute monster, a cerebral sextet adventure stunning in its precisely controlled rock power."

Track listing

Personnel
King Crimson
Robert Fripp – electric guitar, Mellotron, soundscapes
Adrian Belew – electric and acoustic guitars, lead vocals
Tony Levin – bass guitar, Chapman Stick, electric upright bass, backing vocals
Bill Bruford – drums, percussion
Trey Gunn – Chapman Stick, Warr guitar, backing vocals
Pat Mastelotto – drums, percussion

 Technical

 David Bottrill – production, recording

Chart performance

References

External links
 King Crimson - THRAK (1995) album releases & credits at Discogs
 King Crimson - THRAK (1995) album to be listened on Spotify
 King Crimson - THRAK (1995) album to be listened on YouTube

1995 albums
King Crimson albums
Albums produced by David Bottrill
Virgin Records albums